Galleru K, formerly Crome & Goldschmidt, is a shopping arcade situated on Strøget in central Copenhagen, Denmark. Completed in 1901, the building occupies the entire block between Kristen Bernikows Gade, Østergade (Strøget), Antonigade and Pilestræde.

History

The former building at the site was acquired by Crome & Goldschmidt in 1884 and the company opened a department store in the building in 1887.

In 1897, two developers, J. Fisker and A. Volmer, purchased the buildings long the street. They constructed a new building known as Volmerhus at the site in connection with a widening of Kristen Bernikows Gade. It was designed by Erik Schiødte (1849-1909) and Christian Arntzen (1852-1911). Crome & Goldschmidt remained a tenant in the building and installed Denmark's first escalators in it in 1927.

The department store closed when Crome & Goldschmidt merged with Illum in 1971. It was relaunched as City Arkaden ("The City Arcade"). In 2004, a joint-venture between the Danish property developer Keops and the American AIG purchased the building. After a major refurbishment, it reopened in 2006 under the current name.

Design
Galleri K contains about 30 shops and has a total area of about 10,000 square metres over two floors as well as underground parking. The original building is in the Historicist style. A covered atrium and arcade connects Kristen Bernikows Gade to Pilestræde where the architects created a small space with a café.

In popular culture
Crome & Goldschmidt was used as a location in the films En sømand gaar i land (1954)
Far til fire i sneen (1954),
Far til fire i byen (1956) and Tag til marked i Fjordby (1957).

References

External links

 Official website

Retail buildings in Copenhagen
Buildings and structures completed in 1901
2006 establishments in Denmark
Art Nouveau architecture in Copenhagen
Art Nouveau retail buildings